"Do What I Want" is a song by American rapper Lil Uzi Vert. It was released on July 31, 2016, as the first track off of their mixtape The Perfect LUV Tape. The track peaked at number one on the Bubbling Under Hot 100 chart.

Music video 
The music video for the track was released on April 27, 2017. The video was filmed in Honolulu, Hawaii.

Critical reception 
The track received generally positive reviews. Michael Saponara of Billboard called the track "an inspiration to fans across the globe". Sheldon Pearce of Pitchfork said that the track "sums up Uzi’s core philosophy".

Media usage 
The song was used in an October 2016 commercial for Westbrook 0.2 Jordans featuring Russell Westbrook.

The song was used in NBA 2K18's soundtrack.

Charts

Certifications

References 

2016 songs
Lil Uzi Vert songs
Songs written by Lil Uzi Vert
Songs written by Don Cannon
Song recordings produced by Don Cannon
Songs written by Maaly Raw